Aerva revoluta is a species of plant in the family Amaranthaceae.

It is endemic to the archipelago of Socotra, biogeographically part of East Africa, and politically part of Yemen across the Red Sea.

It grows in mountain woodland habitat.

References

revoluta
Endemic flora of Socotra
Flora of Yemen
Taxonomy articles created by Polbot